The Admiral Digby Museum is a museum located in Digby, Nova Scotia exploring the history of Digby the surrounding communities of Digby County. It is housed in a restored Georgian style house facing Digby Harbour known as the Woodrow/Dakin House, one of the oldest buildings in Digby. The house was purchased in 1968 by the Digby Library Association and became the home of the town's first library. A historical society was formed at the library and opened a small display in 1972. The historical society took ownership of the building in 1977 and, after the library moved to larger quarters in 1980, the museum occupied the entire building. The museum is named after Admiral Robert Digby, who brought Loyalists settlers to the town in 1783.  The Museum is free and open year-round. The museum collection includes rare furniture, textiles, photographs and maps. A marine room displays many artifacts from Digby's maritime history. A highlight of the collection is the Gilpin Collection of spectacular watercolour paintings of Sable Island made by a Digby resident who visited Sable during the 1850s.

References

External links 
 Admiral Digby Museum Website
 Museum Listing, Virtual Museum of Canada
 A Journey Through Time: A Virtual History of Digby by the Admiral Digby Museum

Museums in Digby County, Nova Scotia
History museums in Nova Scotia
Museums established in 1972
1972 establishments in Nova Scotia